In the fields of philosophy and of aesthetics, the term philistinism describes the attitudes, habits, and characteristics of a person who deprecates art and beauty, spirituality and intellect. As a derogatory term philistine describes a person who is narrow-minded and hostile to the life of the mind, whose materialistic worldview and tastes indicate an indifference to cultural and aesthetic values.

The contemporary meaning of philistine derives from Matthew Arnold's adaptation to English of the German word Philister, as applied by university students in their antagonistic relations with the townspeople of Jena, Germany, where a row resulted in several deaths, in 1689. About the riot, Georg Heinrich Götze, the ecclesiastical superintendent, applied the word Philister in his sermon about the social class hostilities between students and townspeople. Götze addressed the town-vs-gown matter with an admonishing sermon, "The Philistines Be Upon Thee", drawn from the Book of Judges (Chapt. , Samson vs the Philistines), of the Tanakh (Hebrew Bible), adopted into the Christian Old Testament.

History 
In German usage, university students applied the term Philister (Philistine) to describe a person who was not trained at university; in the German social context, the term identified the man (Philister) and woman (Philisterin) who was not from the university.

In English usage, the term philistine—a person hostile to aesthetic and intellectual discourse—was common British usage by the decade of 1820, and was applied to the bourgeois, merchant middle class of the Victorian Era (1837–1901), whose new wealth rendered some of them hostile to cultural traditions which favored aristocratic power. In Culture and Anarchy: An Essay in Political and Social Criticism (1869), Matthew Arnold said:

Usages

The denotations and connotations of the terms philistinism and philistine describe people who are hostile to art, culture, and the life of the mind, and, in their stead, favor economic materialism and conspicuous consumption as paramount human activities.

17th century
Whilst involved in a lawsuit, the writer and poet Jonathan Swift (1667–1745), in the slang of his time, described a gruff bailiff as a philistine, someone who is considered a merciless enemy.

18th century
The polymath Johann Wolfgang von Goethe (1749–1832) described the philistine personality, by asking:

Goethe described such men and women, by noting that:

In the comedy of manners play, The Rivals (1775), Richard Brinsley Sheridan (1751–1816) identifies a violent aristocrat as 'that bloodthirsty Philistine, Sir Lucius O'Trigger'.

19th century

Thomas Carlyle often wrote of gigs and "gigmanity" as a sign of classist materialism; Arnold recognized Carlyle's use of the term as being synonymous with philistine. Carlyle used "philistine" to describe William Taylor in 1831. He also used it in Sartor Resartus (1833–34) and in The Life of John Sterling (1851), remembering conversations where "Philistines would enter, what we call bores, dullards, Children of Darkness".

The composer Robert Schumann (1810-1856) created Davidsbündler, a fictional society whose purpose is to fight the philistines. This fight appears in some of his musical pieces, such as  Davidsbündlertänze,  Op. 6, and the concluding part of his Carnaval, op. 9, which is titled "Marche des Davidsbündler contre les Philistins".

In The Sickness Unto Death (1849), the philosopher Søren Kierkegaard criticises the spiritlessness of the philistine-bourgeois mentality of triviality and the self-deception of despair.

The philosopher Friedrich Nietzsche (1844–1900) identified the philistine as a person who, for a lack of true cultural unity, can only define style in the negative and through cultural conformity. The essay "David Strauss: the Confessor and the Writer" in Untimely Meditations is an extended critique of nineteenth-century German Philistinism.

20th century
 In the novel Der Ewige Spießer (The Eternal Philistine, 1930), the Austro–Hungarian writer Ödön von Horváth (1901–38) derided the cultural coarseness of the philistine man and his limited view of the world. The eponymous philistine is a failed businessman, a salesman of used cars, who aspires to the high-life of wealth; to realise that aspiration, he seeks to meet a rich woman who will support him, and so embarks upon a rail journey from Munich to Barcelona to seek her at the World's Fair.
 In the Lectures on Russian Literature (1981), in the essay 'Philistines and Philistinism' the writer Vladimir Nabokov (1899–1977) describes the philistine man and woman as:

 In the Lectures on Literature (1982), in speaking of the novel Madame Bovary (1856), about the bourgeois wife of a country doctor, Nabokov said that philistinism is manifest in the prudish attitude demonstrated by the man or the woman who accuses a work of art of being obscene.

See also

References

External links

V.I. Lenin "Philistinism in Revolutionary Circles" 1906

Anti-intellectualism
Pejorative terms for people
Theories of aesthetics